Nabanoor was a monthly Bengali literary magazine published from Kolkata. It was a progressive magazine that encouraged contribution by both male and female authors.

History
Nabanoor was a monthly magazine which started publication in 1903 in Kolkata, Bengal Presidency, British India. The first editor of the magazine was Syed Emdad Ali. The magazine wanted to encourage literary traditions in the Bengali Muslim community. Notable contributors to the magazine included Qazi Imdadul Haq. It continued to publish till December 1906 when it was closed down. The magazine wrote on issues affecting the Muslim community. It also included articles by Muslim women and Bengali Hindus. Begum Rokeya started her literary career by writing for this magazine.

According to Leela Fernandes in the book Routledge Handbook of Gender in South Asia, articles published in the Nabanoor showed a growing divide between the Muslim Bengali and Hindu Bengali community. The two communities accused each other of being against women empowerment. Begum Rokeya published a number of articles on women empowerment in the magazine. Her article Amader Oboniti (our downfall) in 1904 which described jewelry as symbols of enslavement. Her article drew widespread criticism of Muslim men and women.

See more

References

1903 establishments in India
1906 disestablishments in India
Bengali-language magazines
Defunct literary magazines
Defunct magazines published in India
Literary magazines published in India
Magazines established in 1903
Magazines disestablished in 1906
Monthly magazines published in India